The Old Homestead is a surviving 1915 American comedy silent film directed by James Kirkwood, Sr. and written by Hugh Ford and Denman Thompson. The film stars Frank Losee, Creighton Hale, Denman Maley, Louise Huff, Mrs. Corbett and Horace Newman. The film was released on December 26, 1915, by Paramount Pictures.

The movie is based on the popular 19th-century play of the same name by Denman Thompson. The play revolved around the character Joshua Whitcomb, a folksy New England farmer created and often portrayed on the stage by Thompson. In this film, however, the character is called Josiah Whitcomb.

Plot

Cast
Frank Losee as Josiah Whitcomb
Creighton Hale as Reuben Whitcomb
Denman Maley as Jack Hazzard
Louise Huff as Ruth Stratton
Mrs. Corbett as Aunt Tildy
Horace Newman as Cy
Tom Wood as Seth 
Margaret Seddon as	Rickety Ann
Russell Simpson as Sheriff

Preservation status
A copy is preserved by Lobster Films.

References

External links 
 

1915 films
1910s English-language films
Silent American comedy films
1915 comedy films
Paramount Pictures films
Films directed by James Kirkwood Sr.
American black-and-white films
American silent feature films
1910s American films